Henry Thompson Stanton (June 30, 1834 – May 8, 1898), also known as Henry Throop Stanton, was an American poet and lawyer, best known for his poem "The Moneyless Man".

Life 
Stanton was born in Alexandria, Virginia on June 30, 1834 to Richard H. Stanton and Asenath Throop. In 1835, Stanton came with parents to Kentucky and was educated at the Maysville Seminary. He attended West Point as a cadet from 1849 to 1851. He later made a living as an editor and as a lawyer. During the American Civil War, Stanton served as an officer of the Confederate States Army. Afterward, he returned to editing.

Stanton died at his home in Frankfort, Kentucky, on May 8, 1898.

References

External links

1834 births
1899 deaths
19th-century American poets
19th-century American male writers
American lawyers admitted to the practice of law by reading law
American male poets
Poets from Kentucky
Poets from Virginia
Print editors
United States Military Academy alumni